The Sukhoi Su-2 was a Soviet reconnaissance and light bomber aircraft used in the early stages of World War II. It was the first airplane designed by Pavel Sukhoi. The basic design received an engine and armament upgrade (Su-4) and was modified for the ground-attack role (ShB).

Development
In 1936, Joseph Stalin released a requirement for a multipurpose combat aircraft. Codenamed Ivanov, the airplane had to be capable of performing reconnaissance and then attacking the targets it located. P. O. Sukhoi was working in the Tupolev OKB at the time and designed the "Ivanov" aircraft under the tutelage of Andrei Tupolev. The resulting ANT-51 flew on 25 August 1937 with M. M. Gromov at the controls. Powered by a 610 kW (820 hp) Shvetsov M-62 air-cooled radial engine, the  ANT-51 reached 403 km/h (220 kn, 250 mph) at 4,700 m (15,420 ft). This was considered insufficient but since the basic design was sound, it was decided to re-test it with a more powerful engine. Equipped with a 746 kW (1,000 hp) Tumansky M-87 engine, the ANT-51 reached 468 km/h (255 kn, 290 mph) at 5,600 m (18,370 ft) and was accepted into production as BB-1 (Blizhniy Bombardirovschik;  — "short-range bomber"). In 1940, the aircraft was renamed Su-2 and the unreliable M-87 engine was replaced with a Tumansky M-88. This lightened version with an M-88B engine reached 512 km/h (275 kn, 320 mph) in testing.

The Su-2 was of mixed construction. The fuselage was semi-monocoque with wood spars and a plywood skin. The wings were of duralumin and steel construction with fabric-covered rod-actuated control surfaces. The pilot and gunner were protected with 9 mm (0.35 in) of armor. The taildragger landing gear was retractable, including the tailwheel.

Operational history
Although 910 Su-2s were built by the time production was discontinued in 1942, the aircraft was obsolete and underarmed by the start of the Great Patriotic War. In combat, the Su-2 ground attack aircraft squadrons suffered heavy losses against the Germans, with some 222 aircraft destroyed. From 1942, the Su-2 was withdrawn from the frontline and replaced by Ilyushin Il-2, Petlyakov Pe-2 and Tupolev Tu-2 bombers. The Su-2 was relegated to a training and reconnaissance role. However, due to a critical shortage of aircraft in early World War II, some Su-2s were used as emergency fighters.

Loss rate comparison
Although the Su-2 has been criticized due to the number of losses it suffered, its loss rate compares favorably with other attack aircraft used by the Soviet Airforce in World War II.

Variants 

Su-2
Two-seat light bomber and reconnaissance aircraft. Original designation BB-1.

ShB
A proposed ground-attack version with an M-88A engine, modified landing gear which rotated 90° before retracting to the rear into the wings (like the American Curtiss P-40). Bombload was increased to 600 kg (1,235 lb). Created in 1940, the aircraft did not enter production due to availability of the Ilyushin Il-2.

Su-4 
An upgraded version, originally intended for the Urmin M-90 engine with 1,565 kW (2,100 hp), but later fitted with a Shvetsov M-82 (some Su-2s were also fitted with M-82). Due to a shortage of duralumin, the structural elements of the wings were made of wood with plywood skin. Wing armament was changed from four 7.62 mm ShKAS machine guns to two 12.7 mm Berezin UB machine guns. One prototype was built and tested, but this improved version was not placed into production.

Operators

Soviet Air Force

Specifications (Su-4)

Documentary film 
 Light bomber Su-2. Documentary film, USSR, October 14, 1941.Союзкиножурнал, выпуск № 100 от 14 октября 1941 год

See also

References

External links

Su-2 from WINGS PALETTE
Su-2 from Avia press

Su-02
1940s Soviet attack aircraft
1940s Soviet bomber aircraft
Single-engined tractor aircraft
Low-wing aircraft
Aircraft first flown in 1937